Mollah Barfi (also Romanized as Mollah Barfī; also known as Mollā Barfī) is a village in Babuyi Rural District, Basht District, Basht County, Kohgiluyeh and Boyer-Ahmad Province, Iran. At the 2006 census, its population was 164, in 34 families.

References 

Populated places in Basht County